Commander Samuel Robinson, CBE, RD (1870–1958), born in Hull, England, was an early 20th-century British-Canadian mariner, a Commander in the Royal Naval Reserve established under the Naval Reserve Act of 1859, and a captain of luxury liners in the fleet of Canadian Pacific Steamship Ocean Service Ltd. during the period spanning the first three decades of the 20th century. In addition, Samuel was the recipient of the Grand Cordon of the Order of the Chrysanthemum, Japan's highest order.  He was one of three civilians to ever have received this honour while still living (the only others being members of the Japanese Imperial family).

Royal Naval Reserve

The Pacific fleet of the Canadian Pacific Railway tended to hire its officers from the Royal Naval Reserves, and much was made of their long and faithful service to the company. Although Robinson's job description was "Captain," his title was "Commander" because he had earned that rank during his service in the Royal Naval Reserve. During World War I, Robinson captained the Empress of Asia which transported American troops from New York to Southampton, England.

Canadian Pacific
In his 48 years at sea, 37 with Canadian Pacific steamships, Robinson served on a number of vessels. He was captain of two ships with the same name—the 1891 Empress of Japan and the 1930 Empress of Japan—and he was captain of the first of three ships to be named Empress of Canada. His career at sea included sailing on the following: 
 RMS Empress of Japan, junior officer (1895), captain
 RMS Empress of China, chief officer (1899)
 RMS Empress of Asia, captain (1913)
 RMS Empress of Russia, captain (1917)
 RMS Empress of Australia, captain (1922)
 RMS Empress of Canada, captain (1924)
 RMS Empress of Japan, captain (1930)

Robinson was a junior officer on the Empress of Japan in 1895.  He became the chief officer on the Empress of China in 1899, and then captain of the Empress of Japan. He was transferred in 1913 to become the captain of the Empress of Asia.  In May 1914, he pushed the Empress of Asia and her crew in setting a new world's record for both a single day's steaming (473 nautical miles) and for crossing the Pacific (nine days, two hours, and fifteen minutes). In 1917, he took command of the Empress of Russia.  When the Empress of Australia was added to the Canadian Pacific fleet, he was made her first captain. When the Empress of Japan was added to the fleet in 1930, Robinson was given command.

Great Kanto earthquake
When the 1923 Great Kantō earthquake struck Yokohama at a little after noon on 1 September 1923, Captain Robinson was aboard the Empress of Australia.  He was finalising routine preparations for a scheduled departure later in the day; but the greatest natural disaster in modern times was about to reorder those priorities.  He would be credited with saving the ship, his crew and passengers, and more than 3,000 others during the unfolding catastrophe.

The Empress of Australia earned international acclaim and recognition for her captain because it was the ship which was able to offer the most help in evacuating the devastated metropolis of Tokyo. In the chaos which developed after the ground stopped shaking, Robinson kept his ship near the quay at Yokohama in Tokyo Bay for the next twelve days, providing such help as he and his crew were able to offer.

The ship remained anchored off Yokohama for several days, and then she sailed for the port of Kobe laden with refugees.

Robinson's own contributions were minimized in the report he prepared for the Canadian Pacific home office.  He displayed a seemly modesty in this summary:
"One of the most gratifying things, and the dominant factor in the whole proceedings is that everyone with whom we have had to deal on board has worked together without friction, disagreement, or complaint during this terrible catastrophe ... some of the hardest workers having lost families or homes or business possessions, and in some cases all of these."

A group of passengers and refugees who were aboard during the disaster commissioned a bronze tablet and presented it to the ship in recognition of the relief efforts. When the Empress of Australia'' was scrapped in 1952, the bronze tablet was rescued.  It was formally presented to Captain Robinson, then aged 82, in a special ceremony in Vancouver.

Honours
 Commander of the Order of the British Empire (CBE).
 Order of the Chrysanthemum (Japan).
 Order of St John of Jerusalem, the Silver Medal (UK).
 Lloyd's Medal for Meritorious Service (UK).
 Medal of Honour with Red Ribbon.
 Order of the White Elephant (Siam).
 Cross of the Second Class of the Order of Naval Merit (with white badge) (Spain)

Notes

References
 Hammer, Joshua. (2006).  Yokohama Burning: The Deadly 1923 Earthquake and Fire that Helped Forge the Path to World War II. New York: Simon & Schuster.   (cloth)
 Musk, George. (1981).  Canadian Pacific: The Story of the Famous Shipping Line. Newton Abbot, Devon: David & Charles.  
 Robinson, Samuel. (1924).  Official report of Capt. S. Robinson, R.N.R.,: Commander of the Canadian Pacific S.S. "Empress of Australia", on the Japanese earthquake, the fire and subsequent relief operations.
 Tate, E. Mowbray. (1986).  Transpacific Steam: The Story of Steam Navigation from the Pacific Coast of North America to the Far East and the Antipodes, 1867-1941. New York: Cornwall Books.  (cloth)
 Wilson, John W. and Roger Perkins. (1985).  Angels in Blue Jackets: The Navy at Messina, 1908..  Rockland, Maine: Picton Press. 

1870 births
1958 deaths
British Merchant Navy officers
Commanders of the Order of the British Empire
Military personnel from Kingston upon Hull
English emigrants to Canada
Canadian sailors
Seamen from Kingston upon Hull
British Merchant Service personnel of World War I
Royal Navy officers
Royal Naval Reserve personnel